KK Torus is a defunct basketball club based in Skopje, North Macedonia. They played in the Macedonian First League and the Balkan League until the season 2011/2012.

History
The club was founded on 25 May 1999.

Name: KK Torus, KK Torus-SC Boris Trajkovski

Honours

Domestic Achievements
Macedonian Cup Finalist - 2010  
Macedonian Cup Semifinals - 2011, 2012
Macedonian League Semifinals - 2010, 2011

Notable former players

 Bojan Trajkovski
 Pero Blazevski
 Gorjan Markovski
 Ivica Dimčevski
 Vladimir Brčkov
 Jovan Markovski
 Aleksandar Kostoski
 Nikola Karakolev
 Dimitar Karadzovski
 Bojan Krstevski
 Marjan Janevski
 Aleksandar Šterjov
 Jeremiah Boswell
 Justin Reynolds
 Bryan Harrison
 Karon Bradley
 Nemanja Jelesijević
 Zoran Milović
 Aleksandar Held
 Milan Miljković
 Ilija Milutinović
 Aleksandar Opačić
 Igor Tadić

Technical staff

References

External links
Team info from MKF
Team info from Eurobasket

Basketball teams in North Macedonia
Sport in Skopje